Aime Debo Kitenge (born 11 November 1975) is a Burundian retired goalkeeper last with Thanda Royal Zulu in the Premier Soccer League of South Africa.

References

1975 births
Living people
Burundian footballers
Burundi international footballers
Association football goalkeepers
Clydebank F.C. (1965) players
Thanda Royal Zulu F.C. players
Expatriate association footballers in the Republic of Ireland
Burundian expatriate footballers
Maritzburg United F.C. players
Burundian expatriate sportspeople in South Africa
St Patrick's Athletic F.C. players
Expatriate footballers in Scotland
Jomo Cosmos F.C. players
Dynamos F.C. (South Africa) players